Renegade Funktrain is an Australian groove band that formed in 1994. 

Renegade Funktrain was formed by former Sound Unlimited members Rosano and Tina Martinez along with Dereck Antunes. Their single "I Wonder" (a Buddhist-influenced reworking of the Boz Scaggs' song) was nominated for the ARIA Award for Best Dance Release as was their album Renegade Funktrain.

Members
Rosano Martinez – vocals
Tina Martinez – vocals, keyboards
Dereck Antunes – drums, vocals, keyboards
Brian `DJ A.S.K.' Patrick – turntables
Ramesh Sathiah – keyboards
Juan Gonzalez – guitar, vocals
Adam Dehnen – bass
Craig Calhoun

Discography

Albums

Singles
{| class="wikitable plainrowheaders" style="text-align:center;"
|+ List of singles, with selected chart positions
! scope="col" rowspan="2" style="width:14em;"| Title
! scope="col" rowspan="2" style="width:1em;"| Year
! scope="col" colspan="1"| Peak chart positions
! scope="col" rowspan="2" style="width:14em;"| Album
|-
! scope="col" style="width:3em;font-size:85%;"| AUS
|-
! scope="row"| "Testify"
| 1993
| — 
|rowspan="4"| Renegade Funktrain'
|-
! scope="row"| "I Wonder"
| 1995
| 68
|-
! scope="row"| "Renegade Funktrain"/"I Wonder"
|rowspan="2"|1996
| 48
|-
! scope="row"| "Joy"
| — 
|}

Awards and nominations
ARIA Music Awards
The ARIA Music Awards is an annual awards ceremony that recognises excellence, innovation, and achievement across all genres of Australian music..

|-
| 1995 || "I Wonder" || ARIA Award for Best Dance Release || 
|-
| 1996 || Renegade Funktrain'' || ARIA Award for Best Dance Release || 
|-

References

Australian funk musical groups
Musical groups established in 1994